William Welle was the member of Parliament for Great Grimsby in January and October 1377, 1385, and 1391.

References 

Year of birth missing
Year of death missing
English MPs January 1377
Members of the Parliament of England for Great Grimsby
English MPs October 1377
English MPs 1385
English MPs 1391